Savigny-le-Temple is a commune in the Seine-et-Marne Department of France in the Île-de-France in north-central France. It is located in the south-eastern suburbs of Paris,  from the center of Paris. It is the largest commune in the "new town" of Sénart, created in the 1970s.

History
During the French Revolution, Savigny-le-Temple (meaning "Savigny the temple") was temporarily renamed Savigny-sur-Balory  (meaning "Savigny upon Balory", after the small Balory river). It was also temporarily renamed Savigny-le-Port (meaning "Savigny the port"). These changes were probably motivated by the religious connotation of the word "temple".

Demographics
Inhabitants of Savigny-le-Temple are called Savigniens.

Personalities
Claude Makélélé, football player (Real Madrid, Chelsea, Paris Saint-Germain), grew up in Savigny-le-Temple.
Olivier Bernard, football player (Newcastle United, Southampton, Rangers), grew up in Savigny-le-Temple.
Clément Chantôme, football player (Paris Saint-Germain), grew up in Savigny-le-Temple.

Transport
Savigny-le-Temple is served by Savigny-le-Temple – Nandy station on Paris RER line .

See also
Communes of the Seine-et-Marne department

References

External links

Official site 
1999 Land Use, from IAURIF (Institute for Urban Planning and Development of the Paris-Île-de-France région) 

Communes of Seine-et-Marne
Sénart